Kleinlangheim is a municipality in the district of Kitzingen in Lower Franconia, Bavaria in Germany.

References

Kitzingen (district)